C. K. Ramakrishnan Nair (1917 – 16 September 1994), popularly known as C.K. Ra, was an Indian painter, writer, and teacher of fine arts. An advocate of creative freedom, Ramakrishnan Nair was credited with bringing modernism in Kerala painting and heralded the 'Ra phase' in Kerala painting. He served as the superintendent of the Trivandrum School of Arts and later became the chairman of Kerala Lalita Kala Akademi.

Biography

C. K. Ra was born in Thiruvalla to K. Ramavarma Koithampuran of Paliakara Kottaram and Sankaravelil Kunjukuttiyamma. He had his initial training at Ravi Varma School of Painting, Mavelikara under Rama Varma, the younger son of Raja Ravi Varma. After completion of his studies in Mavelikkara, C. K. Ra went to Bombay to work with the British Information Department. During his stint at Bombay, he created a series of paintings about the torments of the Second World War, including Peace after War, Prelude to Revenge, and Massacre. When the war was over he left Bombay and took to teaching, first at a school in Coimbatore and later at the Ravi Varma School of Painting, Mavelikara. C.K. Ra had a brief period of training in Santiniketan and became a disciple of Jamini Roy and Nandalal Bose. When he returned to Kerala to work at the College of Fine Arts Trivandrum it was the beginning of the 'Ra phase' in Kerala painting. Some of the memorable paintings of this period were Temple Fantasia, Washing Hair, and Delightful Pain work that aspire to transcend the practiced responses to color form and meaning. Among C.K. Ra's contemporaries who were based in Trivandrum include, his disciple Chirayinkil Sreekantan Nair, G. Rajendran, B.D. Dethan and N.Divakaran all of whom were the former students of the Trivandrum School of Arts and the self-taught painter and novelist Malayattoor Ramakrishnan. C.K. Ra also wrote on modernism in paintings.

References

1917 births
1994 deaths
Malayali people
Raja Ravi Varma College of Fine Arts alumni
Artists from Thiruvananthapuram
20th-century Indian painters
Painters from Kerala
People from Thiruvalla